Thomas Hay may refer to:
 Thomas Hay (bishop), 15th-century Scottish prelate
 Thomas de la Hay (c. 1342–1406), Scottish baron and soldier
 Thomas Hay, 9th Earl of Kinnoull (1710–1787), Scottish MP
 Thomas Hay (Canadian politician) (1872–1939), Canadian politician
 Thomas William Hay, British Member of Parliament for South Norfolk, 1922–1923
 Thomas Hay (Lewes MP) (1733–1796), British Army officer and politician
 Thomas Hay, 7th Earl of Kinnoull (1660–1719), Scottish peer and Conservative politician

See also
 Thomas Hay-Drummond, 11th Earl of Kinnoull (1785–1866), Scottish peer
 Thomas Hayes (disambiguation)